Intumescentia is Latin for an enlargement (intumescence) in the vertebral column, and may refer to:

Lumbar enlargement
Cervical enlargement